Mauu Siaosi Puepuemai (born ca. 1972) is a Samoan politician. He is a member of the Human Rights Protection Party.

Mauu was raised in Fagaloa before moving to American Samoa. After returning to Samoa in the 1990s he opened a pizza shop, car rental business, and kava farm. He was first elected to the Legislative Assembly of Samoa in the April 2021 Samoan general election, defeating four other candidates to win the seat of Vaa o Fonoti.

Mau resigned from the HRPP on 25 November 2022 to become an independent, citing a request to do so by his constituents.

References

Living people
Members of the Legislative Assembly of Samoa
Human Rights Protection Party politicians
Year of birth missing (living people)